Antônio Pereira de Sousa Caldas (November 24, 1762 – March 2, 1814) was a Colonial Brazilian poet, priest and orator, patron of the 34th chair of the Brazilian Academy of Letters.

About
Sousa Caldas was born in 1762, to Portuguese merchant Luís Pereira de Sousa and Ana Maria de Sousa. Since he was a small boy, he had a vocation for literature, and, at only 8 years old, he was sent to Lisbon, to live under the care of an uncle. With 16 years old, he entered the University of Coimbra, where he learnt mathematics and canon law.

In 1781, he was arrested by the Inquisition because of his ideals, influenced by the Enlightenment. Transferred to the convent of Rilhafoles, he was catechized for six months. After the catechism, he became a fully different person, discovering his sacerdotal vocation. However, he did not abandoned his philosophical and satirical poetry, writing the poem Ode ao Homem Natural in 1784. It is attributed to him the satire O Reino da Estupidez. He also published the poem Ode ao Homem Selvagem.

After graduating in the canon law course in 1789, he travelled to France and Genoa. In Genoa, he wrote the ode A Criação and abandoned the satirical poetry.

In 1801, he returns to Rio de Janeiro to visit his mother, settling permanently in the town. During his final years in Rio, he wrote many letters for his friends, but only five of them exist today.

He died in 1814.

Works
 Ode ao Homem Natural (1784)
 A Criação (1790)
 Poesias Sacras e Profanas (anthology of poems compiled by Francisco de Borja Garção Stockler and published posthumously in 1820)

References

External links
 Poems by Sousa Caldas at the official site of the Brazilian Academy of Letters 
 Sousa Caldas' biography at the official site of the Brazilian Academy of Letters 
 Poems by Sousa Caldas 

1762 births
1814 deaths
Patrons of the Brazilian Academy of Letters
18th-century Brazilian poets
18th-century Brazilian Roman Catholic priests
19th-century Brazilian Roman Catholic priests
Brazilian people of Portuguese descent
University of Coimbra alumni
Brazilian male poets
Writers from Rio de Janeiro (city)
18th-century male writers